Menderson is a surname, which may refer to:

 Charles M. Menderson, American politician, member of the 13th and 14th Arizona State Legislatures
 Nathan Menderson (1820–1904), German-born American business executive and baseball executive

See also
 Mendelssohn (surname)